Frédéric Diefenthal (born 26 July 1968 in Saint-Mandé) is a French actor and director.

Biography
Diefenthal grew up in Saint-Puy in southwestern France. He is Jewish. Prior to acting, Diefenthal pursued apprenticeships in the hotel industry, hairdressing and was also an apprentice pastry chef. He began studies in architecture before switching to drama classes.
Diefenthal began acting in the early 1990s; he held a main role in the French television series Le juge est une femme (The Judge is a Woman), where he first gained a degree of notoriety. He also played a major part in the French Taxi series. 

Diefenthal was previously married  to actress Gwendoline Hamon, with whom he has a son. The pair separated in 2014.

Filmography

References

External links

 
 
 

1968 births
Living people
People from Saint-Mandé
French male film actors
French male television actors
Jewish French male actors
20th-century French male actors
21st-century French male actors